Farah) is a village in the sub-governorate of Bariq in  the province of Asir, Saudi Arabia. It is connected with the main road by a 6.2 Kilometer.

See also 

 List of cities and towns in Saudi Arabia
 Regions of Saudi Arabia

References 

Populated places in Bareq
Populated places in 'Asir Province
Populated coastal places in Saudi Arabia